Transit Australia was a Sydney based monthly magazine covering public transport in Australia and New Zealand. It was the in-house journal of the Australia Electric Traction Association. It was founded in 1946 as Tram Tracks, being retitled Electric Traction in 1949 and Transit Australia in 1987. The final issue was published in June 2018.

References

External links
Official website

Defunct magazines published in Australia
Monthly magazines published in Australia
Transport magazines published in Australia
Magazines established in 1946
Magazines disestablished in 2018
Magazines published in Sydney
1946 establishments in Australia
2018 disestablishments in Australia